The Burmese or Burmese Bantam is a British breed of bantam chicken. It apparently originated in Myanmar, formerly Burma, in the latter part of the nineteenth century. By the time of the First World War it was thought to be extinct. Some surviving individuals were discovered in the 1970s and were bred with white Booted Bantams to recreate the breed.

History 

Charles Darwin mentions the Burmese Bantam in his Variation of Animals and Plants Under Domestication of 1868. According to the Poultry Club of Great Britain the Burmese derives from birds sent to the United Kingdom from Burma in the 1880s by an officer in the British Army. William Flamank Entwisle received one of these birds, apparently a carrier of the creeper gene, and bred from it. By the beginning of the First World War the breed was believed to be extinct.

In 1970 some were given to Andrew Sheppy, who had established the Rare Poultry Society. He bred them with white Booted Bantams and successfully re-established the breed. An attempt has been made in Holland to re-create the Burmese by cross-breeding other bantams, but the results do not closely resemble the birds shown in historic drawings by Harrison Weir and J.W. Ludlow of the original stock.

Characteristics 

The Burmese resembles the Booted Bantam, but is smaller and lower to the ground; it has a small crest. The legs are short, with heavy feathering. The comb is single, the earlobes are small and the wattles drooping and fairly long. Only one colour is recognised by the Poultry Club of Great Britain: the white. The Dutch re-creation is black.

References

Chicken breeds
Bantam chicken breeds
Animal breeds on the RBST Watchlist